Ijara is a town and Sub-County in Garissa County, Kenya. It was previously capital of the former Ijara District.  It is located 100 km north of Lamu and 180 km south of Garissa.

Alternate meanings
Ijara means rent in Arabic.  Ijara  (or Ijarah) is also a sharia-compliant form of mortgage similar to conventional rent-to-own.  The process is also known as Ijara wa Iqtina, or rent with acquisition.

References

Garissa County
Populated places in North Eastern Province (Kenya)